Cryptomaster is a genus of armoured harvestmen in the family Cryptomastridae. There are two described species in Cryptomaster, both found in Oregon.

Species
These two species belong to the genus Cryptomaster:
 Cryptomaster behemoth Starrett & Derkarabetian, 2016
 Cryptomaster leviathan Briggs, 1969

References

Further reading

 
 
 

 

Harvestmen